Thomas Goodwillie may refer to:
 Thomas Goodwillie (sculptor)
 Thomas Goodwillie (mathematician)